Janine Leal Reyes (born 13 November 1976) is a Venezuelan nutritionist, television presenter and model. She ventured into television programs in Ecuador and Peru, becoming known as the main presenter of the Chilean television program Mujeres primero.

Televisión

References

External links 
 Sitio oficial de Mujeres Primero
 Janine Leal en la portada de la revista "Cosas"

1976 births
People from Caracas
Venezuelan female models
Chilean television presenters
Living people
Nutritionists
Women nutritionists